There are over 20,000 Grade II* listed buildings in England. This page is a list of these buildings in the district of Oxford in Oxfordshire.

List of buildings

|}

See also

 Grade I listed buildings in Oxford
 Grade II listed buildings in Oxford
 Grade II* listed buildings in Cherwell (district)
 Grade II* listed buildings in South Oxfordshire
 Grade II* listed buildings in Vale of White Horse
 Grade II* listed buildings in West Oxfordshire

Notes

 
Lists of Grade II* listed buildings in Oxfordshire